The Outsider is a 2018 action thriller film directed by Martin Zandvliet and written by Andrew Baldwin. A Japanese-American production, the film stars Jared Leto, Tadanobu Asano, Kippei Shiina, Shioli Kutsuna, and Emile Hirsch.

The Outsider was released by Netflix on March 9, 2018, and received generally unfavorable reviews from critics.

Plot
In 1954, nine years after the Pacific War, Nick Lowell is the only non-Japanese inmate in an Osaka prison. Most of his fellow inmates are yakuza criminals, recognizable by their irezumi tattoos. Nick saves a yakuza named Kiyoshi from being hanged to death; the Shiromatsu, a yakuza clan to which Kiyoshi belongs, repays his debt by arranging Nick's release. He is also offered a job: Anthony Panetti, an American businessman with a deep hatred for the Japanese, has refused to negotiate a deal with the Shiromatsu but has agreed to a deal with a different clan, the Seizu, because they sent an American negotiator. Nick goes to speak with him, but ends up violently beating Panetti on the head with a typewriter just a minute into the conversation instead, assuring Kiyoshi that he'll reconsider.

When a group of Seizu clan members arrive from Kobe to intimidate the Shiromatsu at their nightclub, Nick attacks one of them, nearly causing a shootout. Kiyoshi takes a liking to Nick, giving him an expensive apartment to live in and a suit to wear. He further entrusts Nick with driving his drunk sister Miyu home after he catches her partying at the Shiromatsu club. Nick spends the night with her and slowly gets more involved with the Shiromatsu clan, becoming one of their enforcers alongside Kiyoshi. He continues his relationship with Miyu and gets an irezumi tattoo on his back to match hers.

The Shiromatsu come under pressure from rival yakuza families, largely due to the aging Shiromatsu patriarch's refusal to adapt to the rapidly changing post-war economy. Kiyoshi sends Nick to the harbor to handle a black market weapons deal, where he is ambushed by four Seizu members, killing two. To avoid a war with the Seizu and as an apology to their patriarch, Nick and Kiyoshi perform an act of yubitsume. The severed fingertips are sent to the Seizu patriarch, who accepts them. Nick is taken to a countryside temple, where he becomes a full member of the Shiromatsu through an initiation ceremony.

During a sumo contest, the two families hold a meeting, with the Seizu patriarch offering his counterpart the chance to retire in peace by absorbing the Shiromatsu; the patriarch refuses and threatens him.

While walking home, Nick is recognized by Paulie Bowers, an American Marine on leave. Paulie remarks that Nick, his former captain, was presumed dead by the Marines after being sought for court-martial. When Paulie tries to blackmail Nick, he lures him back to his apartment and kills him.

Nick learns that Miyu was assaulted by her former lover Orochi, a fellow yakuza, but Miyu stops him from taking revenge by telling him that she is pregnant. Nick goes to Kiyoshi's home and reveals his relationship with his sister. Telling Nick that he is now responsible for keeping Miyu safe, Kiyoshi gives him a daishō, a pair of swords signifying honor. The two men then bury Bowers' body in the woods.

A few days later, Nick saves his patriarch from being strangled to death while at the tailor shop, but Kiyoshi is shot dead during their escape. It becomes clear that most of the Shiromatsu, including Orochi, have betrayed the clan and defected to the Seizu. Nick persuades the patriarch that war is the only option, and takes part in the assassination of several Seizu members. The Seizu patriarch calls for peace talks at the local harbor, which turn out to be a trap. Orochi kills the Shiromatsu patriarch, and Nick is wounded by a shot in the leg from a sniper. Shortly thereafter, police officers burn down the Shiromatsu club.

Undeterred, Nick travels to the Seizu clan dōjō with Kiyoshi's sword and demands an opportunity to kill Orochi. Orochi refuses to fight him, saying that Nick is only a gaijin (outsider) and could never truly be a yakuza. When Orochi hands him back his sword, Nick quickly draws it and cuts Orochi's throat. The Seizu patriarch intervenes and tells Nick to leave now that he has avenged his patriarch. Nick travels to a secure apartment where he has hidden Miyu under the guard of the few remaining Shiromatsu members. He embraces her as the yakuza bow reverently.

Cast
 Jared Leto as Nick Lowell, a former U.S. Marine Captain who is lost from his unit and is later arrested for a series of petty crimes which leads to spending 10 years in a Japanese prison. He becomes attracted to the dangerous lifestyle of the yakuza while in prison, eventually working his way up to becoming the patriarch of a yakuza clan.
 Kippei Shiina as Orochi, a member of the Shiromatsu clan who becomes envious of Nick as he not only gains the trust of his sworn brother Kiyoshi, but also the love of his ex-girlfriend Miyu. He ultimately betrays his family and is murdered by Nick in an act of vengeance.
 Shioli Kutsuna as Miyu, the younger sister of Kiyoshi, who works for the Shiromatsu clan and sports an irezumi tattoo on her back. She becomes attracted to Nick and gets pregnant with his child. 
 Tadanobu Asano as Kiyoshi, a senior member of the Shiromatsu clan who becomes Nick's mentor and sworn brother as he rises through the ranks of the yakuza until his death at the hands of a rival clan.
 Nao Ōmori as Hiromitsu Seizu, the young patriarch of the Seizu clan who seeks to expand his family's power at the expense of the Shiromatsu.
 Min Tanaka as Akihiro Shiromatsu, the elderly patriarch of the Shiromatsu clan who refuses to deal with the Seizu, fearing the loss of his family's power.
 Emile Hirsch as Paulie Bowers, an U.S. Marine lieutenant who served under Nick and threatens to expose him, leading to Nick cutting his throat and burying his corpse with Kiyoshi's help.
 Rory Cochrane as Anthony Panetti, the American owner of a scrap metal plant who does business with the yakuza despite his racist views of the Japanese.
 Young Dais as Takeshi

Production

Development
On November 16, 2016, Netflix entered negotiations with Bloom and AFM to acquire exclusive global rights to the film.

Casting
Michael Fassbender was considered to star in the film when Daniel Espinosa was in talks to direct. Then, Japanese filmmaker Takashi Miike was slated to direct the film with Tom Hardy in the titular role. However, the search for a new lead after Hardy's departure from the project conflicted with Miike's own commitments, which caused his dropout as well. Jared Leto was confirmed to join the cast on April 5, 2016. Leto grew out his hair and beard for most of 2016 to prepare for the role of Nick Lowell and assume the appearance of an American prisoner of war. Tadanobu Asano was added to the cast on May 12. Rory Cochrane was confirmed to join the cast on November 16. Emile Hirsch was added to the cast on December 6.

Filming
Principal photography began in Tokyo, Japan in late September 2016. Principal photography wrapped in Osaka, Japan in December 2016.

Release
The film was released on Netflix on March 9, 2018.

Critical response
The site's critical consensus reads, "Starring a disengaged Jared Leto and stuffed with gangster cliches, The Outsider never distinguishes itself enough to gain admittance into the inner circle of good yakuza pictures." On Metacritic, the film has a weighted average score of 30 out of 100 based on reviews from 12 critics.

On RogerEbert.com, Nick Allen gave The Outsider 1 1/2 stars. He wrote that "“Jared Leto in a yakuza drama” isn’t the most palatable of pitches, but that somehow turns out to not be the movie's biggest problem." Andrew Barker of Variety magazine called it "Dull, flavorless, and fundamentally incurious, “The Outsider” is a clueless misfire, the cinematic equivalent of a study-abroad student showing off the kanji forearm tattoo whose meaning he never bothered to learn."

References

External links
 

2018 films
2018 crime drama films
2018 crime thriller films
American crime drama films
American crime thriller films
English-language Netflix original films
English-language Japanese films
Films produced by Art Linson
Films set in 1954
Films set in Japan
Yakuza films
Japan in non-Japanese culture
2010s English-language films
2010s American films